The episodes for the fifteenth season of the anime series Naruto: Shippuden are based on Part II for Masashi Kishimoto's manga series. The season focuses the battle between Naruto Uzumaki and Madara Uchiha. The episodes are directed by Hayato Date, and produced by Pierrot and TV Tokyo. The season aired from July 2013 to January 2014. 

The English dub of the season began airing on Neon Alley on November 28, 2015 until episode 338 on March 25, 2016, when the digital platform was beginning its shutdown and removed the anime from its rotation. The season would make its English television debut on Adult Swim's Toonami programming block and premiere from December 13, 2020 to July 4, 2021. By May 2021 at episode 339, Adult Swim began showing the never before aired dubbed episodes.

The season contains five musical themes between two openings and three endings. The first opening theme,  by NICO Touches the Walls, is used from episode 321 to 332. The second opening theme,  by Nogizaka46, is used from episode 333 to 348. The first ending theme, by Rake, is used from episode 321 to 332. The second ending theme,  by Akihisa Kondō, is used from episodes 333 to 343. The third ending theme,  by Shinkū Hollow, is used from episode 344 to 348.


Episode list

Home releases

Japanese

English

Notes

References
General

Specific

2013 Japanese television seasons
2014 Japanese television seasons
Shippuden Season 15